Llewellyn Powers (October 14, 1836July 28, 1908) was a U.S. Representative from Maine and the 44th Governor of Maine.

Biography
Born in Pittsfield, Maine, Powers attended the common schools of Pittsfield and St. Albans Academy.  He graduated from the Colburn Classical Institute.  He attended Colby University, Waterville, Maine, and graduated from the law department of Union University, Albany, New York, in 1860.  He was admitted to the bar in Albany, New York, and Somerset, Maine, in 1860 and commenced practice in Houlton, Maine, in January 1861.

He served as prosecuting attorney for Aroostook County from 1864 to 1871.  He also served as collector of customs for the district of Aroostook from 1868 to 1872.  He served as a member of the Maine House of Representatives, 18731876, 1883, 1892, and 1895; during the last term, he served as speaker.  While in the Maine House, his bill abolishing capital punishment was considered by the House in 1876 and passed by a vote of 75 to 68, making Maine the third state to abolish the death penalty.

Powers was elected as a Republican to the Forty-fifth Congress (March 4, 1877March 3, 1879).  He was an unsuccessful candidate for reelection in 1878 to the Forty-sixth Congress.  He served as Governor of Maine from 1897 to 1901.

Powers was elected as a Republican to the Fifty-seventh Congress to fill the vacancy caused by the resignation of Charles A. Boutelle.  He was reelected to the Fifty-eighth, Fifty-ninth, and Sixtieth Congresses and served from April 8, 1901, until his death in Houlton, Maine, July 28, 1908.

In December 1886, Powers married Martha Averill with whom he had five children.  He is buried in West Pittsfield Cemetery, near Pittsfield, Maine.

His brother, Frederick A. Powers, was attorney general of Maine and served on the Maine Supreme Court.

See also
List of United States Congress members who died in office (1900–49)

References

External links

Llewellyn Powers, late a representative from Maine, Memorial addresses delivered in the House of Representatives and Senate frontispiece 1909

1836 births
1908 deaths
Republican Party governors of Maine
Republican Party members of the Maine House of Representatives
Maine lawyers
People from Pittsfield, Maine
Colby College alumni
Albany Law School alumni
Republican Party members of the United States House of Representatives from Maine
County district attorneys in Maine
People from Houlton, Maine
19th-century American politicians